Daughter of Deceit (Spanish: La hija del engaño) is a 1951 Mexican film directed by Luis Buñuel, written by Luis and Janet Alcoriza and starring Fernando Soler, Alicia Caro and Fernando Soto. It is based on the farce Don Quintín, el amargao by Carlos Arniches and Antonio Estremera.

The film is part of the "generic, assembly-line pictures that Buñuel was offered to direct" while he was making films in Mexico. Buñuel had previously been a scriptwriter, although uncredited, for an earlier film adaptation of Don Quintín, el amargao made in his native Spain in 1935. As a result, it is the only work of which Buñuel made two versions.

Plot
Don Quintin, a man who is always having economic problems, one day comes home to find his wife in bed with another man. He begins having doubts about the paternity of his daughter and decides to leave. Years later he decides to find her.

Cast
 Fernando Soler as Quintín Guzmán
 Alicia Caro as Martha
 Fernando Soto as Angelito
 Rubén Rojo as Paco
 Nacho Contla as Jonrón
 Amparo Garrido as Jovita
 Lily Aclemar as María
 Álvaro Matute as Julio
 Roberto Meyer as Lencho García
 Conchita Gentil Arcos as Toña García
 Francisco Ledesma as Don Laureano, bartender
 Armando Acosta as Waiter (uncredited)
 Armando Arriola as Gambler (uncredited)
 Victorio Blanco as Gambler (uncredited)
 Lupe Carriles as Woman on the street (uncredited)
 Enrique Carrillo as Policeman (uncredited)
 Gerardo del Castillo as Cabaret announcer (uncredited)
 Enedina Díaz de León as Neighbor (uncredited)
 José Escanero as Gambler (uncredited)
 Jesús García as Onlooker in accident (uncredited)
 Isabel Herrera como Onlooker in accident (uncredited).
 Cecilia Leger as Neighbor (uncredited).
 Xavier Loyá as Young gambler (uncredited)
 Pepe Martínez como Bartender (uncredited)
 Lucrecia Muñoz as Client in cabaret (uncredited)
 Rubén Márquez as Man dancing in cabaret (uncredited)
 Ignacio Peón as Client (uncredited)
 Jorge Pérez as Gossipy young man (uncredited)
 Salvador Quiroz as Manager at train station (uncredited)
 Polo Ramos as Messenger (uncredited)
 Joaquín Roche as Man in restaurant (uncredited)
 Félix Samper as Old man kicked (uncredited)
 Hernán Vera as Lencho's friend (uncredited)
 Acela Vidaurri as Client in cabaret (uncredited)

See also
 Mexican films of 1951

References

External links
 

1951 films
Films based on works by Carlos Arniches
Films directed by Luis Buñuel
1950s Spanish-language films
Mexican comedy-drama films
1951 comedy-drama films
Mexican black-and-white films
1950s Mexican films